Saint Aprus (Aper, Apre, Epvre, Evre, Avre) was a 7th-century French priest and hermit.  He is the namesake of Saint-Avre.  A native of Sens, he was a hermit near La Chambre and Saint-Jean-de-Maurienne.  He founded a refuge for pilgrims and the poor in the village named after him.

His feast day is December 5.

External links

http://www.greenspun.com/bboard/q-and-a-fetch-msg.tcl?msg_id=007HMJ

French hermits
7th-century Frankish saints
People from Sens